Rašćane Viaduct is located between the Zagvozd and Ravča interchanges of the A1 motorway in Croatia.

Rašćane Viaduct is the most significant structure built on Zagvozd – Ravča section of the A1 motorway. The viaduct actually consists of two parallel structures, each carrying one motorway carriageway consisting of two traffic lanes and an emergency lane. Overall width of the viaduct is just under . The viaduct was built using incremental launching to ensure the maximum quality and the minimum damage to the environment. The speed limit enforced on the viaduct is 130 km/h.

Traffic volume
Traffic is regularly counted and reported by Hrvatske autoceste, operator of the viaduct and the A1 motorway where the structure is located, and published by Hrvatske ceste. Substantial variations between annual (AADT) and summer (ASDT) traffic volumes are attributed to the fact that the bridge carries substantial tourist traffic to the Adriatic resorts. The traffic count is performed using analysis of motorway toll ticket sales.

See also
List of bridges by length

References

Box girder bridges
Bridges completed in 2008
Toll bridges in Croatia
Viaducts in Croatia
Buildings and structures in Split-Dalmatia County
Transport in Split-Dalmatia County